Shaoguan Prison is a prison in Guangdong province of China. It is situated in  Shaoguan. It is a prison with an area of more than 1000 km2.

References

See also
 List of prisons in Guangdong

1951 establishments in China
Prisons in Guangdong
Buildings and structures in Shaoguan